203 East 29th Street is a historic house and carriage house located between Second and Third Avenues in the Kips Bay neighborhood of Manhattan, New York City, one of a small number of wooden houses that remain on Manhattan Island.  The year the house was built is uncertain, having been variously dated from as early as around 1790 to as late as 1870.

The house, which was added to the National Register of Historic Places on July 8, 1982, is privately owned and not open to the public.  The architect was James Cali, and the restoration architect was John Sanguilano.

See also
National Register of Historic Places listings in Manhattan from 14th to 59th Streets

References
Notes

External links

Houses on the National Register of Historic Places in Manhattan
Houses completed in 1790
Houses in Manhattan
Kips Bay, Manhattan